Progress M-54, identified by NASA as Progress 19P, was a Progress spacecraft used to resupply the International Space Station. It was a Progress-M 11F615A55 spacecraft, with the serial number 354.

Launch
Progress M-54 was launched by a Soyuz-U carrier rocket from Site 1/5 at the Baikonur Cosmodrome. Launch occurred at 13:07:54 UTC on 8 September 2005.

Docking
The spacecraft docked with the aft port of the Zvezda module at 14:42:03 UTC on 10 September 2005. It remained docked for 175 days before undocking at 10:06:10 UTC on 3 March 2006. It was deorbited at 13:05:00 UTC on 3 March 2006. The spacecraft burned up in the atmosphere over the Pacific Ocean, with any remaining debris landing in the ocean at around 13:52:18 UTC.

Progress M-54 carried supplies to the International Space Station, including food, water and oxygen for the crew and equipment for conducting scientific research. It also carried the radio transmitter for the RadioSkaf satellite, which was assembled aboard the ISS using a retired Orlan spacesuit.

See also

 List of Progress flights
 Uncrewed spaceflights to the International Space Station

References

Spacecraft launched in 2005
Progress (spacecraft) missions
Spacecraft which reentered in 2006
Supply vehicles for the International Space Station
Spacecraft launched by Soyuz-U rockets